Church of St Cecilia may refer to:

England
St Cecilia's Church, Girton

Italy
Santa Cecilia in Trastevere

Malta
Santa Cecilia Chapel, Għajnsielem, Gozo, Malta

United States
St. Cecilia Church (Stamford, Connecticut)
St. Cecilia Church in San Francisco
St. Cecilia's Cathedral, Omaha, Nebraska
St. Cecilia's Church and Convent (New York City), NRHP-listed
St. Cecilia's Church (New York City)